To Play or to Die is a 1990 Dutch gay-related psychological drama film directed by Frank Krom in his directorial debut and co-written by Krom and Anne van de Putte based on a story by Anna Blaman.

Plot
In this short motion picture, schoolboy Kees is intelligent, introvert and sensitive, but gets ridiculed verbally and physically at an all-boys school by mindlessly cocky classmates and even insensitive teachers, especially in gym, where his physical weakness is mercilessly abused to make him a defenceless laughing stock in front of his smirking peers. His awakening sexual interest goes to boys, and in particular to Charel, a beautiful athletic classmate who probably feels an undetermined interest but would never risk admitting (possibly not even to himself) having any gay or bi appreciation, least of all for a 'sissy', and thus remains unresponsive to shy Kees' overtures. When the hunk finally comes over to Kees' place while his parents are away, a desperate disappointment with a tragical twist is in the making.

Cast
 Geert Hunaerts as Kees van Wouden
 Tjebbo Gerritsma as Charel
 Joost Hienen as Charel's friend
 Cock van der Lee as Charel's friend
 Mike Starink as Charel's friend
 Marc van Uchelen as Charel's friend
 Diane Lensink as Mother
 Wim Van Der Grijn as Father
 Hilde Van Mieghem as French Teacher
 Titus Muizelaar as Phys. Ed. Teacher
 Simon Gribling as Math. Teacher

Reception
While there are no critical reviews, the film received mixed reviews from audiences, holding a 17% rating on Rotten Tomatoes based on 72 user reviews, with an average rating of 3.3/5.

References

External links
 
 

1990 films
1990s Dutch-language films
1990s psychological drama films
1990 LGBT-related films
Dutch drama films
Dutch independent films
Dutch LGBT-related films
Dutch thriller films
Films about bullying
1990s psychological thriller films
Films directed by Frank Krom
1990 directorial debut films
1990 drama films